Botho Wendt August Graf zu Eulenburg (31 July 1831 – 5 February 1912) was a Prussian statesman.

Early life and career
Eulenburg was born in Wicken near Bartenstein to Botho Heinrich zu Eulenburg (1804–1879) and Therese née von Dönhoff (1806–1882). He studied law at the universities of Königsberg and Bonn.

Eulenburg worked in high positions of the Prussian and German administration in Wiesbaden (1869–1872), Metz (president of the Département de la Lorraine; 1872–1873) and upper president of the Province of Hanover (1873–1878). 
In March 1878 Eulenburg succeeded his first cousin once removed Friedrich Albrecht zu Eulenburg as Minister of the Interior, serving under Bismarck. He implemented a series of repressive anti-socialist measures. From 1881 to 1892 he was the president of the province of Hesse-Nassau.

Prime Minister of Prussia
In 1892, he was appointed Prime Minister of Prussia in succession to Leo von Caprivi, who however remained Chancellor of Germany. 

Though Caprivi had recommended the experienced administrator Eulenburg for this appointment, the new prime minister soon made life difficult for Caprivi, and often thought of pressing for his removal. Both Caprivi and Eulenburg were eventually dismissed by Wilhelm II following the renewal of anti-Socialist moves (and an anti-subversion bill) in 1894. Eulenburg often thought of himself as the only possible successor to Caprivi, and he was extremely unhappy to be dismissed at what he regarded as the moment of his destiny. 

From 1899 until his death, Eulenburg was a member of the Prussian House of Lords. He died in Berlin in 1912 and is buried in No. I cemetery of Trinity Church, Berlin-Kreuzberg.

Personal life and family
Eulenburg was the older brother of August zu Eulenburg, Marshal of the Prussian royal court, and a second cousin of Prince Philip of Eulenburg, a close friend of Wilhelm II, German Emperor, and an instrumental figure behind the scenes of German politics.

On 25 October 1875 he married at Neustadt, West Prussia Elisabeth von Alvensleben (22 September 1834 in Brandenburg/Havel – 5 September 1919 in Neustadt), by whom he had an only son, Botho (15 February 1879 in Berlin – 30 May 1881 in Berlin).

Honours 
He received the following orders and decorations:

Notes

References 

1831 births
1912 deaths
People from the Province of Prussia
German Conservative Party politicians
Counts of Germany
Prime Ministers of Prussia
Members of the Prussian House of Lords
University of Königsberg alumni
University of Bonn alumni
Interior ministers of Prussia
Recipients of the Iron Cross (1870), 2nd class
Grand Crosses of the Order of the Dannebrog
Recipients of the Order of the Netherlands Lion